Doreen Roberson Carter (born March 19, 1963) is a politician from Georgia. A Democrat, she is a member of the Georgia House of Representatives representing the state's 92nd district.

Political career 
Carter sat on the City Council in Lithonia, Georgia from 2007 to 2011.

In 2012, Carter ran for election to represent District 92 in the Georgia House of Representatives, but lost a five-way Democratic primary. In 2014, she ran for Secretary of State, but lost the general election to Brian Kemp.

In 2015, former 92nd district representative Tonya Anderson resigned to run for a seat in the State Senate. Carter ran for the seat again, and won. She was reelected unopposed in 2016 and 2018, and is running again in 2020.

As of July 2020, Carter sits on the following committees:
 Code Revision
 Education
 Industry and Labor
 Small Business Development
 Special Rules

References 

1963 births
Living people
People from Lithonia, Georgia
Democratic Party members of the Georgia House of Representatives
Women city councillors in Georgia (U.S. state)
Women state legislators in Georgia (U.S. state)
21st-century American politicians
21st-century American women politicians